Rosenthal Field was a ballpark in Lubbock, Texas, home to the Lubbock Hubbers, who played in many professional leagues for many years before it was no longer in use.

Notes

References
 "Texas Almanac 2008–2009", The Dallas Morning News, c.2008

Baseball venues in Texas
Baseball in Lubbock, Texas
Sports venues in Lubbock, Texas
Former buildings and structures in Lubbock, Texas